Mitochondrial import inner membrane translocase subunit TIM44 is an enzyme that in humans is encoded by the TIMM44 gene.

Interactions
TIMM44 has been shown to interact with ARAF.

See also
 Mitochondria Inner Membrane Translocase
 TIMM17A
 TIMM22
 TIMM23

References

Further reading

External links 
 PDBe-KB provides an overview of all the structure information available in the PDB for Human Mitochondrial import inner membrane translocase subunit TIM44

Mitochondrial proteins